Gbadamosi is a surname. Notable people with this surname include:

Amosa Gbadamosi (born 1942), Ghanaian footballer
Babatunde Gbadamosi (born 1967), Real estate developer and politician.
Bakare Gbadamosi (born 1930), Nigerian poet
Gabriel Gbadamosi,  British poet, playwright and novelist of Irish-Nigerian descent
Nureni Gbadamosi (born 1947), Nigerian boxer
Raimi Gbadamosi (born 1965), British artist and writer
TGO Gbadamosi, Nigerian historian

Surnames of African origin